George Godwin was an architect.

George Godwin may also refer to:

George Nelson Godwin (1846–1907), English cleric and antiquarian
George Stanley Godwin (1889–1974), author
K. George Godwin, editor of The Gypsies of Svinia

See also
George Goodwin (disambiguation)